The Industrial National Bank Building, located at 111 Westminster Street or 55 Kennedy Plaza in downtown Providence, Rhode Island, was built in 1928 as the Industrial Trust Co. Building, and was designed by the New York firm of Walker & Gillette. At  with 26 floors, it is the tallest building in Providence and the state of Rhode Island, and the 28th tallest in New England; when it was completed it stood several stories higher than the recently finished Biltmore Hotel nearby.

Known through the years as the "Fleet Bank Tower", the "Bank of America Building", and, most recently, "111 Westminster", locally it is commonly referred to as the "Superman Building", because of its visual similarity to the headquarters of the Daily Planet newspaper seen in the Superman comic book and shown on The Adventures of Superman TV series from the 1950s. 

The building has been vacant since Bank of America moved out in April 2013. An estimate in 2016 was that it would take $115 million to rehabilitate the building. Requests for public financing were rejected in 2017.

History

Butler Exchange Building
Before the current building was erected, the site was the location of the six-story Butler Exchange Building. Located at 55 Exchange Place and constructed in 1872, the land was purportedly deeded by the heirs of the original Samuel Butler. Due to address changes across the city, by 1913 it bore the address 123 Westminster. The 1872 building housed the Rhode Island Commercial School which was purchased and merged into Bryant & Stratton College in 1916, the forerunner of Bryant University. It housed many retail businesses such as Dodge and Camfield, importers and grocers; A. & L. Tirocchi Gowns; and the Waite Auto Supply Company. The Providence Ladies' Sanitary Gymnasium was also a tenant. After a devastating fire, the Butler Exchange Building was demolished in 1925, to make way for a new tower. Though the community did not like the plans for the building because of its height, construction materials, and design

Industrial Trust Company
Commissioned in 1925 by the Industrial Trust Company – founded in 1886 by Samuel P. Colt – the current building was constructed in 1927-1928. during the inter-war boom period as the Industrial Trust Tower. Designed in the Art Deco style popular at the time, the building opened for tenants on October 1, 1928.

It was renamed the Fleet Bank Tower when Industrial Trust changed its name to Fleet Financial Group in 1982. It remained Fleet's headquarters until Fleet merged with Shawmut National Bank in 1995 and moved to Boston. Fleet retained ownership of the building even after it merged with BankBoston as FleetBoston Financial in 1998.

In 2004, FleetBoston Financial was acquired by Bank of America, and the building became the Bank of America Building. In 2008, shortly before the Great Recession, the building was purchased by High Rock Development of Massachusetts for $33.2 million. Bank of America was the building's sole tenant, and utilized about half the building. Bank of America invested $7 million in a new sprinkler and fire safety system.

Vacancy
In 2012, Bank of America, still the sole tenant, decided not to renew its lease. The bank vacated the building, leaving it empty.

High Rock's request for public funds to redevelop the building was turned down. State taxpayers, still smarting from the controversial money-losing loan to 38 Studios in 2012, were in no mood to offer public funding or tax credits.

In 2016, it was estimated that at least $115 million would be needed to rehabilitate the building.

Bank of America litigation
In 2013, High Rock sued Bank of America for millions of dollars, claiming that the bank had neglected upkeep of the building and left it in a deteriorating state. The building is pockmarked with gaps of missing limestone, and is surrounded by scaffolding to prevent injuries to passers-by. High Rock brought suit in the United States District Court for the District of Rhode Island, claiming that the bank failed to meet its repair and replacement obligations under a long-term lease, rendering the building unleasable. High Rock sought up to $54 million in damages. The bank brought a counterclaim seeking recovery of monies spent removing furniture from the building after the lease expired. The counterclaim was subsequently dismissed by the court (Smith, J.), and the case was scheduled for trial in May 2017. Shortly after jury empanelment, the bank settled the suit on confidential terms.

Architecture

The building was a steel-frame structure sheathed in Indiana limestone, with Deer Isle granite at its base. The tower was advertised as "A Business Building for Building Business". It has six wings stemming from a central tower.

The skyscraper was designed in the stepped-back style, which originated in Manhattan, New York City in response to the 1916 zoning law which sought to increase the amount of air and light in downtown Manhattan, but when this building was on the drawing board in late 1925 or early 1926, very few building of this type had been built elsewhere in the U.S. There were no such zoning restrictions in Providence, nevertheless, New York architects Walker & Gillette chose to include the innovative symmetrical stepped massing, with the assistance of local architect George Frederick Hall of Martin & Hall.

The base and the trim at the base's top were built to match the cornice height of existing adjacent (now gone) four-story buildings. The majority of relief art is found on the cornice of the tower's base, where 22 frames depict scenes of Native American and Colonist interaction and stages of Industrialization alongside four seals, and four eagles.

Dual street-level staircases rise at the east and west ends of a stately columned grand hall, which is three stories high and runs the length of the building; it contains large windows that overlook Kennedy Plaza and the Westminster Arcade. The balcony level of the grand hall contains the lobby and entrance to an intimate ballroom with marble fireplaces and brass chandeliers.

The 26th floor hosted the executive office of Industrial Trust Company. The suite contains secretary staff common areas, dining room and offices. A stairway leads to the higher north-face 29th level private 'dining car' or Gondola room designed to resemble the gondola of an airship; the room contains a wine closet and dark leather details. A peregrine falcon nest box is located in the area. The 28th and 29th floors contain a gravity water-service system; two large tanks  on these levels feed the building. The 29th floor contains a lavatory for service to the Gondola rooms and adjoining balconies.

In the basement is a vault, designed by Frederick S. Holmes that houses small and large items, supplied with storage areas for client possessions such as fine rugs. The vault has a 17-ton (15.5 tonne) door.

The metal doors and trim were manufactured by Dahlstrom Metallic Door Company of Jamestown, New York. Some of the street-level doors possess relief art of eagles in brass. The original glass of the beacon was of a green hue, and topped with a decorative globe, surrounded by a circle of stone eagles weighing 7.5 tons (6.8 tonnes). In 1932, it was damaged and repaired after a lightning strike. This architectural feature was removed in 1950 after one eagle fell to the street in 1930.

Floors 5, 12, 14, 17, 18, 26 and 30 recede to form the building's distinctive profile. From nightfall until midnight, the building's peak is traditionally lit a bright blue with varying red and green at Christmas and Valentine's Day. The building has remained relatively unchanged over the years with the exception of the lobby, the upper windows and the two story turret tower and light beacon. Due to its vacant occupancy the exterior lights illuminating the superstructure are not lit. In 1973, the beacon tower was turned off for the first time since 1928 to conserve energy.

Gallery

Rehabilitation effort
The building has remained relatively unchanged through the years. The latest update (2007) was tenant Bank of America's new fire suppression systems, which cost $7 million.

In 2011, media reports speculated that Bank of America, the building's last tenant, would move out at the end of its ten-year lease; which eventually led to the bank's 2012 announcement that it would vacate the space the coming year. In March 2013, Bank of America officially ceased operations at the building leaving it unoccupied. The Providence nighttime skyline was subsequently affected as the exterior nighttime lighting used to illuminate the upper structure was shut off, with the exception of the peak light.

Subsequently, new owner High Rock Development - which purchased the building in 2008 for $33 million - proposed to convert the building into mostly luxury apartments, involving $80 million in tax credits from the State. This plan was rejected and the State has applied to move some of their Health and Human Services offices into the now vacant property. High Rock Development has since offered a four-year plan that would require $40 million in new funding for the rehabilitation of the tower into a mix of uses that include retail, business and 285 residential units. The former and new financing proposals were met with mixed reaction with several individuals noting High Rock Development has $200 million available to put towards the rehab effort but has declined to do so.

An independent appraisal was completed in 2012, and in 2014 the Providence group Scotti and Associates used that appraisal to decide that the building had "no value."

In December 2017, Paolino Properties and Gilbane Development announced a plan that would involve demolishing the building and replacing it with a new 36-story building. This is one of several plans being pitched to Hasbro for a new headquarters in downtown Providence.

In popular culture
111 Westminster is commonly referred to as the "Superman Building", due to its resemblance to the Daily Planet building in the Superman comic book. However, Superman co-creator Joe Shuster claims he drew his inspiration not from the Providence building (nor the also rumored AT&T Huron Road Building in Cleveland, Ohio, where Shuster was living at the time), but rather from his home city of Toronto (such as the Commerce Court North and the Fairmont Royal York). The building shown in the Adventures of Superman television program, however, is the Los Angeles City Hall.

The building and its neighbors are displayed prominently on the skyline of the fictional City of Quahog, Rhode Island, the setting of the American adult animated sitcom Family Guy. The building is often seen behind the Griffin family's home on fictional Spooner Street.

See also
List of tallest buildings by U.S. state

References

External links

Entry on Skyscraperpage.com
Entry on Emporis
 

Skyscraper office buildings in Providence, Rhode Island
Commercial buildings completed in 1927
Office buildings completed in 1927
Bank buildings in Rhode Island
Art Deco architecture in Rhode Island
1927 establishments in Rhode Island